James Kelley House may refer to:

James Kelley House (Tennille, Georgia), listed on the National Register of Historic Places (NRHP) in Washington County
James Kelley House (Bowling Green, Kentucky), listed on the NRHP in Warren County

See also
Kelley House (disambiguation)